Jaroslav Plesl (born 20 October 1974) is a Czech actor.

Selected filmography

Film
 Grandhotel (2006)
 Men in Rut (2009)
 Největší z Čechů (2010)
 Sunday League – Pepik Hnatek's Final Match (2012)
 Family Film (2015)
 Murder in Polná (2016)
 A Vote for the King of the Romans (2016)
 Toman (2018)
 Rašín (2018)
 The Watchmaker's Apprentice (2019)
 Emergency Situation (2022)
 Arvéd (2022)
 The Last Race (2022)

Television
 Helena (2012)
 Čtvrtá hvězda (2014)
 Autobazar Monte Karlo (2015)
 Život a doba soudce A. K. (2017)
 Zkáza Dejvického divadla (2019)
 Zločiny Velké Prahy (2021) 
 Ochránce (2021)  
 Tajemství pana M. (2022)
 Stíny v mlze (2022)
 The King of Šumava: The Phantom of the Dark Land (2022)

References

External links
 

  
1974 births
Czech male film actors
Czech male stage actors
Czech male voice actors
Czech male television actors
21st-century Czech male actors
Actors from Hradec Králové
Janáček Academy of Music and Performing Arts alumni
Czech Lion Awards winners
Living people